The Denny Vaughan Show is a Canadian music variety television series which aired on CBC Television from 1954 to 1957.

Premise
The series began as a 1954 mid-season production featuring Denny Vaughan (piano) and Joan Fairfax (vocals), with an informal, easy listening approach. It entered the regular season schedule in October 1955 when it was sponsored by Lever Brothers, and its format changed to showcase segments featuring guest comedians and musicians from the US. The final season, 1956–57, reverted to a primarily musical format featuring more Canadian artists. Vaughan's orchestra was also concealed from viewers until it was seen on the last season. Guests also included French Canadian artists. However, viewership declined and the series was cancelled in 1957.

Scheduling
This half-hour series was broadcast as follows (times in Eastern):

References

External links
 
 

CBC Television original programming
1954 Canadian television series debuts
1957 Canadian television series endings
1950s Canadian variety television series
Black-and-white Canadian television shows